The heaviest atomic nuclei are created in nuclear reactions that combine two other nuclei of unequal size into one; roughly, the more unequal the two nuclei in terms of mass, the greater the possibility that the two react. The material made of the heavier nuclei is made into a target, which is then bombarded by the beam of lighter nuclei. Two nuclei can fuse into one only if they approach each other closely enough; normally, nuclei (all positively charged) repel each other due to electrostatic repulsion. The strong interaction can overcome this repulsion but only within a very short distance from a nucleus; beam nuclei are thus greatly accelerated in order to make such repulsion insignificant compared to the velocity of the beam nucleus. Coming close alone is not enough for two nuclei to fuse: when two nuclei approach each other, they usually remain together for approximately 10−20 seconds and then part ways (not necessarily in the same composition as before the reaction) rather than form a single nucleus. If fusion does occur, the temporary merger—termed a compound nucleus—is an excited state. To lose its excitation energy and reach a more stable state, a compound nucleus either fissions or ejects one or several neutrons, which carry away the energy. This occurs in approximately 10−16 seconds after the initial collision. 

The beam passes through the target and reaches the next chamber, the separator; if a new nucleus is produced, it is carried with this beam. In the separator, the newly produced nucleus is separated from other nuclides (that of the original beam and any other reaction products) and transferred to a surface-barrier detector, which stops the nucleus. The exact location of the upcoming impact on the detector is marked; also marked are its energy and the time of the arrival. The transfer takes about 10−6 seconds; in order to be detected, the nucleus must survive this long. The nucleus is recorded again once its decay is registered, and the location, the energy, and the time of the decay are measured.

Stability of a nucleus is provided by the strong interaction. However, its range is very short; as nuclei become larger, their influence on the outermost nucleons (protons and neutrons) weakens. At the same time, the nucleus is torn apart by electrostatic repulsion between protons, as it has unlimited range. Nuclei of the heaviest elements are thus theoretically predicted and have so far been observed to primarily decay via decay modes that are caused by such repulsion: alpha decay and spontaneous fission; these modes are predominant for nuclei of superheavy elements. Alpha decays are registered by the emitted alpha particles, and the decay products are easy to determine before the actual decay; if such a decay or a series of consecutive decays produces a known nucleus, the original product of a reaction can be determined arithmetically. Spontaneous fission, however, produces various nuclei as products, so the original nuclide cannot be determined from its daughters.

The information available to physicists aiming to synthesize one of the heaviest elements is thus the information collected at the detectors: location, energy, and time of arrival of a particle to the detector, and those of its decay. The physicists analyze this data and seek to conclude that it was indeed caused by a new element and could not have been caused by a different nuclide than the one claimed. Often, provided data is insufficient for a conclusion that a new element was definitely created and there is no other explanation for the observed effects; errors in interpreting data have been made.

Notes

References

Bibliography 
 pp. 030001-1–030001-17, pp. 030001-18–030001-138, Table I. The NUBASE2016 table of nuclear and decay properties
 
 
 
 

Synthetic elements
heaviest elements
Heaviest or most massive things